Dale Donald Eve (born 9 February 1995) is a Bermudian footballer who plays as a goalkeeper for Hereford and the Bermuda national team.

Career

Stoke City
Eve started playing football for his local side Dandy Town Hornets before moving to England to play for Derby County's youth team. He spent a short time in the East Midlands before being spotted by scouts at Premier League club Stoke City who signed him to on a two-year development contract in June 2011 beating off competition from Manchester City. Eve made his international debut at the age of 16 making him Stoke City's youngest player to be capped taking the record from Hungarian Ádám Vass. In May 2012 Eve signed a two-year professional contract with Stoke.

Eve joined Fleetwood Town on loan in December 2013 and made three substitute appearances on the bench before returning to Stoke City in January 2014. He joined Nuneaton Town on loan in March 2014 and made his debut on 28 March against Braintree Town. Speaking after his loan spell at Nuneaton Eve stated that it was a "humbling experience".

In the 2014–15 season, Eve had short loan spells with non-league sides Newcastle Town and Congleton Town. Eve joined Forest Green Rovers on a one-month loan in September 2015. He returned to Stoke in November 2015, with his only appearance for Forest Green coming in a FA Cup qualifier against Margate.

Forest Green Rovers
Eve joined Forest Green Rovers on 4 February 2016 on a free transfer. He was a part of a squad that reached the 2015-16 National League play-off final at Wembley Stadium, but did not make an appearance in the final as the club lost 3–1 to Grimsby Town to miss out on promotion to the Football League. It was announced on 16 May 2016 that he had been released at the end of his contract at The New Lawn.

Later career
Eve returned to Bermuda for a spell back at Dandy Town but in January 2017 moved back to England to sign for Ilkeston. In October 2017 he spent time on trial at Football League side Walsall. Shortly after he had a spell with Rushall Olympic, before moving to Kidderminster Harriers in November 2017.

In February 2020, he joined Spennymoor Town. In May 2020 it was announced that he had extended his stay at Spennymoor. In October 2022, after the spell period, he was signed by Hereford.

International career
Eve has progressed through the youth teams of Bermuda and was called up to the senior squad in November 2011. He made his international debut for the "Gombey Warriors" in a 2014 FIFA World Cup qualification match against Barbados where he came on as a second-half substitute in a 2–1 victory. He appeared again for the national football team in March 2015 playing the second round of the 2018 FIFA World Cup qualification match against Bahamas and keeping a clean sheet in a 3–0 victory. In the next round, he played the second leg match against Guatemala in a 1–0 loss that eliminated Bermuda from the qualifiers.

Career statistics

Club

International

References

External links
 
 

1995 births
Living people
Bermudian footballers
Association football goalkeepers
Stoke City F.C. players
Fleetwood Town F.C. players
Nuneaton Borough F.C. players
People from Pembroke Parish
National League (English football) players
Newcastle Town F.C. players
Congleton Town F.C. players
Forest Green Rovers F.C. players
Bermudian expatriate footballers
Expatriate footballers in England
Bermudian expatriate sportspeople in England
2019 CONCACAF Gold Cup players
Rushall Olympic F.C. players
Kidderminster Harriers F.C. players
Ilkeston F.C. players
Hereford F.C. players
Bedford Town F.C. players
Hanley Town F.C. players
Bermuda international footballers